"Orbion" is an instrumental composition by Dutch disc jockey and record producer Armin van Buuren. The track was released in the Netherlands by Armind as a digital download on 13 February 2012 as the seventh single from his fourth studio album Mirage.

Reviews
According to the website "Trance History", the track "reflects [van Buuren's] true musical style in the choice of sounds and in the construction of a refrain always from dance floor".

Music video
A music video to accompany the track was released to YouTube by Armada Music channel on 10 February 2012.

Track listing
 Digital download 
 "Orbion" (radio edit) – 2:47
 "Orbion" (extended version) – 9:34
 "Orbion" (Max Graham vs. Protoculture remix) – 7:53
 "Orbion" (Eco remix) – 7:28

Charts

References

2012 singles
Armin van Buuren songs
2012 songs
Songs written by Armin van Buuren
Armada Music singles
Songs written by Benno de Goeij